Nationality words link to articles with information on the nation's poetry or literature (for instance, Irish or France).

Events
 February 24 – John Milton marries his third wife, Elizabeth Minshull, 31 years his junior, at St Mary Aldermary in the City of London.
 Robert Herrick begins publishing his Poor Robin's Almanack

Works published

 Samuel Butler, Hudibras. The First Part: Written in the time of the late wars, published anonymously (see also Hudibras, The Second Part 1664, Hudibras. The First and Second Parts 1674, Hudibras. The Third and Last Part 1678, Hudibras. In Three Parts 1684)
 Abraham Cowley, Verses, Lately Written Upon Several Occasions
 Sir William Davenant, Poem, to the King's Most Sacred Majesty
 John Dryden, To The Lady Castlemaine, Upon Her Incouraging His First Play, a poem
 Thomas Jordan, A Royal Arbor of Loyal Poesie
 Józef Bartłomiej Zimorowic, Sielanki nowe ruskie (New Ruthenian Pastorals)

Births
Death years link to the corresponding "[year] in poetry" article:
 February 25 – Peter Anthony Motteux, born Pierre Antoine Motteux (died 1718), French-born English playwright, translator, editor, author and poet
 August 20 – Amalia Königsmarck (died 1740), Swedish noble and dilettante
 October 9 – Giovanni Mario Crescimbeni (died 1728), Italian critic and poet
 William King (died 1712), English writer
 George Stepney (died 1707), English diplomat and poet

Deaths
Birth years link to the corresponding "[year] in poetry" article:
 Bihari Lal (born 1595), Hindi poet, wrote the Satasaī ("Seven Hundred Verses")
 Approximate date – Robert Sempill the younger (born c.1595), Scottish poet

See also

 Poetry
 17th century in poetry
 17th century in literature
 Restoration literature

Notes

17th-century poetry
Poetry